The Death and Life of Otto Bloom is a 2016 Australian mockumentary drama film written and directed by Cris Jones, starring Xavier Samuel, Rachel Ward and Matilda Brown. The film is produced by Alicia Brown, Mish Armstrong and Melanie Coombs.

The film had its premiere at, and opened, the 65th Melbourne International Film Festival on 28 July 2016.

Plot 
The chronicle of the life and great love of Otto Bloom, an extraordinary man who experiences time in reverse – passing backwards through the years only remembering the future.

Cast
 Xavier Samuel as Otto Bloom
 Rachel Ward as Dr. Ada Fitzgerald
 Matilda Brown as Young Ada Fitzgerald
 Rose Riley as Suzi Noon
 Terry Camilleri as Bob Simkin
 Jason Agius as Young Bob Simkin
 Amber Clayton as Nora Baron
 Jacek Koman as Miroslaw Kotok
 Tyler Coppin as J.C. Tippit
 Suzy Cato-Gashler as Nell Allen
 John Gaden as Prof. Charles Reinier
 Richard Cawthorne as Duane Renaud

Production

Development
Jones cites Albert Einstein's perspective of time as a source of inspiration for the film, explaining "that the perception we are moving forward through time is an illusion. Time is just another dimension of the physical universe, and every moment is therefore simultaneously real... It was a fascinating idea and a powerful philosophy for me, because there's a lot of consolation that comes with it. I was looking for a story in which you could take this philosophy and a positive message and tell it as a film. The idea of how to do it came several years later."

Filming
The film was shot in January 2016 in and around Melbourne.

Release
The Death and Life of Otto Bloom premiered at, and opened, the 65th Melbourne International Film Festival on 28 July 2016.

Reception
The film holds a 50% approval rating on Rotten Tomatoes.

In her review for the Daily telegraph, Vicky Roach described the film as a "budget time-travelling romance" that "boggles with sheer ingenuity." The Guardian awarded the film 3/5 stars, calling it "refreshingly unpredictable, a particularly pleasing virtue in these dark days of superhero this and sequel that." Craig Mathieson of the Sydney Morning Herald praised the film, stating: "Cris Jones' debut feature is that rare thing: a mock documentary that reaches a genuine emotional depth." In particular, he welcomed Ward's return to screen, writing, "it's a remarkable performance: unassuming but wrenchingly powerful". Sarah Ward of Screen Daily was less impressed, writing "it is never as substantial, involving, or convincing as it aims to be".

Accolades

Cris Jones was also posthumously honoured with the Australian Writers’ Guild's $10,000 John Hinde Award for Excellence in Science-Fiction Writing. His mother, Karen, accepted on his behalf.

References

External links
 

Australian drama films
2016 films
Films shot in Melbourne
Films about time travel
2010s English-language films
2010s mockumentary films
2010s Australian films